This is a list of Norwegian television related events from 1962.

Events
18 February - Inger Jacobsen is selected to represent Norway at the 1962 Eurovision Song Contest with her song "Kom sol, kom regn". She is selected to be the third Norwegian Eurovision entry during Norsk Melodi Grand Prix held at NRK Studios in Oslo.

Debuts

Television shows

Ending this year

Births
18 December - Dorthe Skappel, TV personality and journalist

Deaths